Neocollyris discretegrossesculpta is a species of ground beetle in the genus Neocollyris in the family Carabidae. It was described by Horn in 1942.

References

Discretegrossesculpta, Neocollyris
Beetles described in 1942